Hoveyda can refer to :
Amir-Abbas Hoveyda (1920–1979), Prime Minister of the imperial government of Iran 1965–1977.
Amir H. Hoveyda is professor of chemistry at Boston College at the US, and currently holds the position of department chair.
Fereydoon Hoveyda (1924–2006) was an influential Iranian diplomat, writer and thinker.